Sidney Ainsworth (born Charles Sydney Ainsworth, often credited as Sydney Ainsworth; December 21, 1872 – May 21, 1922), was a screen and stage actor who appeared in his first movie in 1909. He was born in Manchester, England and died in Madison, Wisconsin, United States.

Filmography

Mr. Wise, Investigator (1911)
The Man Who Found Out (1914) 
The Romance of an American Duchess (1915)
The Fable of the Bachelor and the Back-Pedal (1915) (as Sydney Ainsworth) 
The Conflict (1915) 
Lieutenant Governor (1915) 
Third Hand High (1915) 
Countess Veschi's Jewels (1915) (as Sydney Ainsworth) 
Above the Abyss (1915) 
The Greater Courage (1915) (as Sydney Ainsworth) 
The White Sister (1915) (as Sydney Ainsworth) .... Capt. Ugo Severi 
The Fable of the Scoffer Who Fell Hard (1915) 
The Counter Intrigue (1915) 
A Bag of Gold (1915) .... John Elliott 
Eyes That See Not (1915) 
Inheritance (1915) 
In the Palace of the King (1915) (as Sydney Ainsworth) .... Don Antonio Perez 
A Bit of Lace (1915) 
The Fable of Sister Mae, Who Did As Well As Could Be Expected (1915) 
The Strange Case of Mary Page (1916) 
The Misleading Lady (1916) .... Henry Tracey 
According to the Code (1916) (as Sydney Ainsworth) .... John Andrews 
The Woman Always Pays (1916) 
When Justice Won (1916) 
 The Prince of Graustark (1916) .... Count Quinnox 
The Chaperon (1916) (as Sydney Ainsworth) .... Count Van Tuyle 
The Burning Band (1916) (as Sydney Ainsworth) 
Wife in Sunshine (1916) (as Sydney Ainsworth) 
The Extravagant Bride (1917) 
When the Man Speaks (1917) (as Sydney Ainsworth) 
The Wide, Wrong Way (1917) 
The Vanishing Woman (1917) (as Sydney Ainsworth) 
Ashes on the Hearthstone (1917) (as Sydney Ainsworth) 
The Wifeless Husband (1917) (as Sydney Ainsworth) 
 The Trufflers (1917) .... Peter Ericson Mann 
On Trial (1917) .... Robert Strickland 
Two-Bit Seats (1917) (as Sydney Ainsworth) .... Merton Styles 
Brown of Harvard (1918) (as Sydney Ainsworth) .... Victor Colton 
A Man and His Money (1919) .... Walter Randall 
The Little Rowdy (1919) .... Roy Harper 
One Week of Life (1919) .... LeRoy Scott 
The Crimson Gardenia (1919) .... Francois 
 Heartsease (1919) (as Sydney Ainsworth) .... Sir Geoffrey Pomfret 
The Girl From Outside (1919) .... Spencer 
The Loves of Letty (1919) .... Ivor Crosby 
 The Gay Lord Quex (1919) .... Sir Chichester Frayne 
The Woman in Room 13 (1920) .... Andy Lewis
Out of the Storm (1920) .... Al Levering 
A Double-Dyed Deceiver (1920) .... Thacker 
The Cup of Fury (1920) (as Sydney Ainsworth) .... Verrinder 
Madame X (1920) .... Laroque 
Half a Chance (1920) .... Jack Ronsdale 
The Branding Iron (1920) .... Jasper Morena 
 Hold Your Horses (1921) .... Horace Slayton 
Boys Will Be Boys (1921) .... Sublette 
Doubling for Romeo (1921) .... Pendleton/Mercutio 
The Invisible Power (1921) .... Bob Drake 
A Poor Relation (1921) .... Sterrett 
Mr. Barnes of New York (1922) .... Danella

External links

1872 births
1922 deaths
American male silent film actors
American male film actors
British emigrants to the United States
Naturalized citizens of the United States
Male actors from Manchester
20th-century American male actors